This article lists the cantonal executives of Switzerland. Each canton of Switzerland has its own executive body, as well as legislative body.  The Federal Council is the executive of the Swiss federal government, and is included for purposes of comparison.

The cantonal executives are collegial bodies, each with 5 or 7 members.

General structure

Presidents of the executives 
The above mentioned collegial bodies are formally chaired by a president. However those presidents are primus inter pares, that is a first among equals in the council. 

Other than presiding over meetings and the ability to cast tie-breaking votes the president only holds ceremonious powers.

In the list below, if nothing else is noted, the official name of the office of president of the respective cantonal executive is Regierungsratspräsident (Government council president).

Elections 
The cantonal governments are directly elected every four years. In some cantons the voters have the ability to (among candidates they also voted for as member of the government) vote for a president. From all members elected to the government, the member that has then received most votes for president, is directly elected president and then remains in that office for the entirety of their term as member of the council, i.e. 4 years (e.g. Basel-Stadt). In other cantons the electorate only appoints members to the council and the presidency rotates according to seniority among members (e.g. Zürich and also in the federal council).

The date of the elections is not the same as the date of the start of the tenure. For example the elections in Aargau were held in 2020 but the tenure of the new Executive started on 1 January 2021.

List 
The below list is up to date .

Notes and references

See also
 List of cantonal legislatures of Switzerland

 
Executive